Me and My Sister are an English pop band from the Isle of Wight, made up of sisters, Vicki and Becky Lutas. They are best known for their performance on GMTV. In 2010 they became a full band when musicians Luke Steen and Ross Mabey joined and together they performed at Bestival 2010.

The band had their song "Speaking on the Telephone" used on the BBC teenage drama series The Cut.

Members
Vicki Lutas – lead vocals, guitar
Becky Lutas – lead vocals, keyboard
Luke Steen – drums, keyboard, vocals
Ross Mabey – bass guitar

References

External links
 Me and My Sister official website

English pop music groups
English indie rock groups
British comedy musical groups
Musical groups from the Isle of Wight
Musical groups established in 2008
Sibling musical duos